The Yukjin dialect is a dialect of Korean or a Koreanic language spoken in the historic Yukjin region of northeastern Korea, south of the Tumen River. It is unusually conservative in terms of phonology and lexicon, preserving many Middle Korean forms. Thus, Alexander Vovin classifies it as a distinct language. Yukjin speakers currently live not only in the Tumen River homeland, now part of North Korea, but also in diaspora communities in Northeastern China and Central Asia that formed in the nineteenth and twentieth centuries. The dialect is under pressure from Standard Seoul Korean, the language's prestige dialect, as well as local Chinese and Central Asian languages.

History and distribution

The Sino-Korean term   'six garrisons' refers to the six towns of Hoeryŏng, Chongsŏng, Onsŏng, Kyŏngwŏn, Kyŏnghŭng, and Puryŏng, all located south of a bend of the Tumen River. The area of these towns belonged to the Tungusic Jurchens until the early fifteenth century, when King Sejong conquered the area into Korea's Hamgyong Province and peopled the six towns with immigrants from southeastern Korea. The Yukjin dialect is the distinctive Koreanic variety spoken by their descendants. The Yukjin dialect of the six towns is further divided into an eastern variety, typified by the speech of Onsŏng and Kyŏngwŏn, and a western variety as spoken in Hoeryŏng and Chongsŏng. The eastern variety preserves more phonological archaisms. Some analyses consider the language of Kyŏnghŭng and Puryŏng to belong to the mainstream Hamgyong dialect rather than to Yukjin.

Yukjin is divergent from the dialect prevalent in the rest of Hamgyong Province, called the Hamgyŏng dialect, and generally more closely aligned with the western Pyongan dialect. Some of the earliest descriptions of Hamgyong dialects—from the seventeenth century—already noted that the speech of the Yukjin area was different from that of the rest of Hamgyong. The 1693 provincial gazette Bukgwan-ji stated that while most of Hamgyong had a "most divergent" dialect, the Yukjin area had "no provincial speech" of its own because it had been settled by people from the southern provinces, who continued to use the standard southern dialects. In 1773, the high-ranking official Yu Ui-yang also wrote that the language of Yukjin was easier to understand than southern Hamgyong dialects because it was more similar to southern varieties of Korean, although he conceded that "when I first heard it, it was difficult to understand".

Despite these previous similarities to southern dialects, Yukjin has now become the most conservative mainland variety of Korean because it was not subject to many of the Early Modern phonological shifts that produced the modern mainland dialects. The Hamgyŏng dialect, which participated in these shifts, now resembles the southern dialects to a greater extent than Yukjin.

In response to poor harvests in the 1860s, Yukjin speakers began emigrating to the southern part of Primorsky Krai in the Russian Far East.
Their speech was recorded in a dictionary compiled in 1874 by Mikhail Putsillo, and in materials compiled in 1904 by native speakers who were students at the Kazan Teacher's Seminary.
Larger waves of immigrants from other parts of North Hamgyong arrived in the area in the 1910s and 1920s, fleeing the Japanese annexation of Korea.
In the 1930s, Stalin had the entire Korean population of the Russian Far East, some 250,000 people, forcibly resettled, in particularly to what is now modern Uzbekistan and Kazakhstan. There are small Korean communities scattered throughout especially Central Asia maintaining forms of Korean known collectively as Koryo-mar, but their language is under severe pressure from local languages and Standard Seoul Korean.
About 10 percent of Koryo-mar speakers use the Ryukjin language/dialect.

The Japanese annexation of Korea also triggered migration from northern parts of Korea to eastern Inner Manchuria, and more Koreans were forcibly transferred there in the 1930s as part of the Japanese occupation of Manchuria.
Linguists in China divide the Korean varieties spoken in Northeast China into Northwestern (Pyongan), North-central (Hamgyŏng) and Northeastern (Yukjin) groups.
The latter are spoken in the easternmost part of Jilin province.

Consequently, the dialect's current speakers are scattered between the traditional Tumen River homeland, now part of North Hamgyong and Rason, North Korea; Korean communities in parts of Northeast China; Koryo-saram communities in the post-Soviet states; and people from the Yukjin region who have fled to South Korea since the division of Korea in the 1940s. Kim Thay-kyun studied the speech of North Hamgyong refugees in the 1980s. Research on speakers currently residing in the North Korean homeland is rare, and conducted primarily by Chinese researchers of Korean ethnicity. The dialect appears to have declined in North Korea due to extensive state enforcement of the country's standard variety of Korean.

The Jaegaseung, descendants of Jurchen people who lived in the Tumen River valley, spoke typical Yukjin Korean despite their isolation from mainstream Korean society.

Phonology

The Ryukjin dialect has eight vowels, corresponding to the eight vowels of standard Seoul Korean.

This vowel represents an intermediate stage in a diachronic sound shift from   >  >  . The sound shift is now complete for younger speakers and the vowel has disappeared among them, although older speakers retain the vowel.

These are new divergences between Yukjin and the Seoul standard.

In Yukjin, the consonant  is usually realized as its typically North Korean value, . It is realized as  before , and the consonant-glide sequence  is also realized as the single affricate . In non-Soviet dialects,  is obligatory intervocally, while  and  may both be used otherwise.

Many features of Middle Korean survive in the dialect, including:

 the pitch accent otherwise found only in other Hamgyong varieties and the southern Gyeongsang dialect
 preservation of initial  before  and 
 preservation of Middle Korean alternative noun stems that appear when followed by a vowel-initial suffix, e.g.

In some respects, Yukjin is more conservative than fifteenth-century Middle Korean.

Similarly, the Middle Korean word  'two' has one syllable, but its rising pitch indicates that it is descended from an earlier disyllabic form with high pitch on the second syllable, and some Old Korean renderings also suggest two syllables. Some Yukjin varieties have  for this word, preserving the older disyllabic form. The dialect has accordingly been described as a highly conservative phonological "relic area".

Grammar

Nouns

Verbs

Most analyses of the verbal paradigm identify three speech levels of formality and politeness, which are distinguished by sentence-final suffixes. Scholars differ on which suffixes mark which speech level.  Several formal-level markers have an allomorph beginning with  after consonants, reflecting their origin as a compound of a preexisting marker and the honorific-marking verb-internal suffix , which takes the allomorph  after a verb stem ending in a vowel. Mood-marking sentence-final suffixes which have been identified by Chinese, Korean, and Western researchers include:

Syntax

Highly unusually, the Yukjin negative particle (such as  'not',  'cannot') intervenes between the main verb and the auxiliary, unlike in other Koreanic varieties (except other Hamgyŏng varieties) where the particle either precedes the main verb or follows the auxiliary.

When followed by the verb  'to be like', the normally adnominal verbal suffixes  and  function as nominalizers. Nominalization was the original function of the two suffixes, being the main attested use in Old Korean, but was already rare in the Middle Korean of the early fifteenth century.

Lexicon

The basic Yukjin lexicon is unusually archaic, preserving many forms attested in Middle Korean but since lost in other dialects. Remarkably, no distinction is made between maternal and paternal relatives, unlike other Korean dialects (including Jeju) which distinguish maternal uncles, aunts, and grandparents from paternal ones. This may reflect weaker influence from patriarchal norms promoted by the Neo-Confucian Joseon state.

There are a few loans from Jurchen or its descendant Manchu. This includes the verb stem   'to breed an animal', from the Manchu verb stem  'to copulate [for dogs]' with the Koreanic causative suffix  attached;   'wicker basket' from Manchu  'id.'; and   'goose-catching snare' from Manchu  'id.' There are also a few loanwords from Northeastern Mandarin. Among remaining speakers in the post-Soviet states, there are many Russian borrowings and calques.

Notes

References

Citations

Works cited

Further reading 
 
 
 

Koreanic languages
Korean dialects
Korean language in North Korea
Languages of North Korea